The 1997–98 UC Irvine Anteaters men's basketball team represented the University of California, Irvine during the 1997–98 NCAA Division I men's basketball season. The Anteaters were led by 1st year head coach Pat Douglass and played at the Bren Events Center and were members of the Big West Conference.

Previous season 
The 1996–97 UC Irvine Anteaters men's basketball team finished the season with a record of 1–25 and 1–15 in Big West play, the worst record in program history. At the end of the season, head coach Rod Baker did not have his contract renewed. On March 27, 1997, Cal State Bakersfield head coach Pat Douglass was announced as the seventh head coach in program history.

Roster

Schedule

|-
!colspan=9 style=|Non-Conference Season

|-
!colspan=9 style=|Conference Season

|-
!colspan=9 style=| Big West Conference tournament

Source

Awards and honors
Ben Jones
Big West All-Freshman Team

Source:

References

UC Irvine Anteaters men's basketball seasons
UC Irvine
UC Irvine Anteaters
UC Irvine Anteaters